Flame of the forest is a common name for several plants and may refer to:

Butea monosperma
Delonix regia, native to Madagascar
Mucuna bennettii, native to Papua New Guinea
Spathodea

See also
Flame tree (disambiguation)